Clytra binominata is a species of leaf beetles in the subfamily Cryptocephalinae. It can be found in Turkey and Greece (including the island of Rhodes).

References

Beetles described in 1953
Beetles of Asia
Beetles of Europe
Clytrini